Chuyevka is a rural locality (a selo) in Kozmodemyanovsky Selsoviet of Tambovsky District, Amur Oblast, Russia. The population was 178 as of 2018. There are 2 streets.

Geography 
Chuyevka is located 13 km northeast of Tambovka (the district's administrative centre) by road. Kozmodemyanovka is the nearest rural locality.

References 

Rural localities in Tambovsky District, Amur Oblast